The 1977 European Athletics Indoor Championships were held in San Sebastián, a city in Spain, on 12 and 13 March 1977.

Medal summary

Men

Women

Medal table

Participating nations

 (12)
 (12)
 (8)
 (17)
 (9)
 (26)
 (10)
 (3)
 (11)
 (1)
 (1)
 (13)
 (1)
 (1)
 (7)
 (21)
 (1)
 (19)
 (18)
 (5)
 (7)
 (2)
 (31)
 (4)

References
Results - men at GBRathletics.com
Results - women at GBRathletics.com
EAA

 
European Athletics Indoor Championships
European Indoor Championships
International athletics competitions hosted by Spain
European Athletics Indoor Championships
European Athletics Indoor Championships